Galy may refer to:

 Galy Records, a Canadian independent record label
 Galy Galiano (born 1958), Colombian composer
 Audrey Galy (born 1984), French rower

See also
 Gali (disambiguation)